Chapada is an upper middle class neighborhood in the South-Central Zone of Manaus, Amazonas.

References

Neighbourhoods in Manaus